Andy Lambert is an American football coach. He is the head football coach at Concordia University Chicago in River Forest, Illinois, a position he has held since 2021. Lambert served as the head football coach at Trinity International University in Deerfield, Illinois from 1997 to 2003, Sterling College in Sterling, Kansas from 2004 to 2015, and Southern Nazarene University in Bethany, Oklahoma from 2016 to 2019.

Coaching career

Trinity International
Lambert was the head coach at Trinity International University in Deerfield, Illinois from 1997 through 2003. His record at Trinity was 22 wins and 11 losses. In 2003 he was named "Coach of the Year" by the Mideast League in the Mid-States Football Association. During his time at Trinity International University he coached his favorite team in 2001.  Top seniors included Mark Clinton, Gilbert Crispin, Quincy Sands, Ben Youngkin and Mike Torres.  That team was a bootleg in overtime away from making his first NAIA playoff appearance, where senior linebacker Chris Michelson missed a tackle as the sidelines warned him of the play.  They ended going to the NCCAA Championship where Adam Warner had his best long-snapping game in his career as the team punted often losing 54-14 to Gardner Webb.  Notable contributions in the season came from Scout Team All-Americans, Daniel Clay and Chad Cox.

Sterling
Lambert was the head football coach at Sterling College in Sterling, Kansas from 2004 to 2015. Sterling won the program's first Kansas Collegiate Athletic Conference (KCAC) championship in 2013.

Southern Nazarene
After the 2015 season, Lambert accepted the position as the head coach at Southern Nazarene University starting with the 2016 season.

Eastern Michigan
Lambert spent time as a Defensive Analyst at Eastern Michigan prior to taking the job at Concordia.

Head coaching record

References

External links
 Corcordia (IL) profile
 Southern Nazarene profile

Year of birth missing (living people)
Living people
Eastern Michigan Eagles football coaches
Concordia Cougars football coaches
Southern Nazarene Crimson Storm football coaches
Sterling Warriors football coaches
Trinity International Trojans football coaches